Camorta or Kamorta may refer to:
 Kamorta Island, one of India's Nicobar Islands
 Kamorta (village), a village on the island
 Camorta language, an Austroasiatic language spoken there
 SS Camorta, a 19th-century British steamship
 INS Kamorta, a ship in the Indian Navy